Alexander Höck (born 30 March 2002) is a German professional footballer who plays as a defender for Werder Bremen II.

Career
In April 2022 it was announced that Höck would join Werder Bremen II for the 2022–23 season.

Career statistics

References

External links
 

2002 births
Living people
Sportspeople from Cologne
German footballers
Association football defenders
3. Liga players
Bayer 04 Leverkusen players
FC Viktoria Köln players